General elections were held in Singapore on 13 April 1968, its first as a sovereign city-state.

Background
Following the resignations of eleven MPs from Barisan Sosialis (BS, Socialist Front) and two other BS MPs leaving Singapore in protest against independence, five by-elections were held within three years but PAP were successful in winning all the seats, resulting in a monopoly.

Campaign
BS boycotted the elections on the grounds that Singapore's independence was "phoney" and several opposition parties heeded its call. The leaders of Pertubuhan Kebangsaan Melayu Singapura (formerly the local branch of the UMNO), Ahmad Haji Taff, and the Singapore Chinese Party (formerly the local branch of the MCA), Chng Boon Eng, turned up but did not file their nominations. Three precedents were made in this election: the fewest seats (seven) contested in a general election, and the first time PAP was returned to power on nomination day and the first time it won all seats. Walkovers also became a perpetual feature in every succeeding general election until 2015.

Timeline

Electoral system

The 58 members of Parliament were elected in 58 single-member constituencies, an increase from 51 in the 1963 elections. The constituencies introduced or removed in the election, as well as constituencies with changes of boundaries, are shown on the table:

Results

By constituency

Notes

References

Singapore
General elections in Singapore
1968 in Singapore